Clive Pullen (born 18 October 1994) is a Jamaican athlete specialising in the triple jump. He represented his country at the 2016 Summer Olympics without qualifying for the final.

His personal bests in the event are 16.90 metres outdoors (+1.9 m/s 2016) and 17.19 metres indoors (Fayetteville 2017).

International competitions

References

1994 births
Living people
Jamaican male triple jumpers
Athletes (track and field) at the 2016 Summer Olympics
Athletes (track and field) at the 2018 Commonwealth Games
Olympic athletes of Jamaica
Jamaican expatriates in the United States
Arkansas Razorbacks men's track and field athletes
Olympic male triple jumpers
Athletes (track and field) at the 2019 Pan American Games
Pan American Games competitors for Jamaica
Commonwealth Games competitors for Jamaica